Ángel Ceña Tutor (born 24 October 1967) is a Spanish civil servant and politician. As the lead candidate for the party Soria ¡Ya! (SY) within the coalition Empty Spain (EV), he was elected to the Cortes of Castile and León in the 2022 elections.

Biography
Born in Soria, Castile and León, Ceña graduated in Law and History from the University of Valladolid. He then became a civil servant, obtaining the role of chief transport inspector. In 2019, he took part in a protest in Madrid to raise awareness of the depopulating rural areas known as "Empty Spain".

When regional president  Alfonso Fernández Mañueco called a snap election for February 2022. In January, he was chosen to lead the campaign for Soria ¡Ya! (SY), a regionalist party within the Empty Spain (EV) platform. The party was the most voted for in the province with 42.6% of the votes, taking three of the five seats.

Ceña is a fan of his hometown football club CD Numancia, and Atlético Madrid.

References

1967 births
Living people
People from Soria
University of Valladolid alumni
21st-century Spanish politicians
Members of the 11th Cortes of Castile and León